Senator Ashley may refer to:

Bob Ashley (born 1953), West Virginia State Senate
Chester Ashley (1790–1848), U.S. Senator from Arkansas from 1844 to 1848
Delos R. Ashley (1828–1873), California State Senate